Well Pole Creek is a stream in the U.S. state of South Dakota.

Well Pole Creek received its name from a well (complete with pole and rope) which stood near the creek.

See also
List of rivers of South Dakota

References

Rivers of Custer County, South Dakota
Rivers of South Dakota